Cervantes, officially the Municipality of Cervantes, is a 4th class municipality in the province of Ilocos Sur, Philippines. According to the 2020 census, it has a population of 19,449 people.

The municipality is officially the Summer Capital of Ilocos Sur. It has a relatively cooler climate than most of lowland Ilocos Sur due to its geographical location and proximity to Mountain Province and Benguet. The municipality is home to the Bessang Pass Natural Monument.

Etymology
How it got the name is not known or documented but it is believed that it was named after the famous poet Miguel de Cervantes. But the town's history was tied to the poet's name and the people living on the town adopted it as their own official name.

History

The earliest known historical document about Cervantes was that, it started as a small Igorot Village known as “Mantamang”, an Igorot word meaning “to look over”. Igorot traders and Chinese merchants who always had to pass the village frequently used man and horse trails connecting the lowland and upland neighboring localities.

On March 4, 1879, the residents of Mantamang petitioned that the village be recognized as a Christian town under Lepanto-Amburayan sub-province of Mountain Province. The town was given the name Cervantes and that remained the name of the town up to the present.

Maximo Lilio de Garcia has written that Cervantes was formerly a barrio when it was founded by the Spanish colonizers. It started with only thirty (30) houses made of light building materials like bamboo and cogon. In spite of the fertile lands that abound the place the native used to cultivate only small patches of ricefield, which made the barrio unprogressive.

Lilio further stated that Cervantes has a distance of twenty-four (24) kilometers from Lepanto. The system of communication was maintained on a weekly basis due to its poor road that traversed the sloppy mountains zigzagging upward the hills back of Cayus where the storage house was located and down to the lowlands reaching the Malaya River, which sometimes overflow during rainy season making the trail slippery.

During the Spanish Era, a portion of the land near the Abra River bank was used as a penal colony by the Spanish soldiers who brought with them the Ilocanos from the lowlands. In 1883, a Malaria epidemic affected the colony prompting the Spanish officials to move to the upland, which is now the present location of the town proper. 5,000 grams of quinine ended the epidemic.

At that time the barrio was founded between Abra and Malaya Rivers, the inhabitants were distributed among the three (3) rancheria. The first settlement was established on an elevated healthful well-ventilated place, where a small house for the children of the neighboring barrios a storage building for tobacco and barracks were constructed. Springs were the source of potable clean and abundant water supply. The natives cultivated and produced vegetables and fruits suitable to the climate. Coffee was produced on the land annexed to the commendancia.

The next group of settlement founded a rancheria less than a half-kilometer distance from the first settlement. This time better types of houses were built with an estimated population of 819 residents migrating from other rancherias and barrios of Mailac Cambaguio and Magucmay. Then another small community was developed with both sections of Cervantes where a spacious administrative building, other ruinous edifices and barracks built of wood for the civil guards, were located.

Gradually these original settlers of the area, the Igorot were displaced and forced to move to the hills and mountains. This explains why at present Igorot are mostly settled in far-flung barrios while the Ilocanos, mestizos and those who intermarried with Chinese, Spaniards, Americans and other foreigners populate the central area of the municipality.

The constantly growing of trade in this mountain area made it necessary that it should have a good outlet to the coast. A road was constructed from Cervantes going west over the Malaya Range exiting at the town of Tagudin, Ilocos Sur. This road was later improved and widened and became passable all the way to Bontoc.

During the American rule, the Philippine Commission passed Act No. 410 and Sec. 1 of said act, states: “The territory hitherto comprised in the Commendancia of Lepanto, Bontoc and Amburayan, together with territory lying between the boundaries of Abra, Cagayan and Bontoc and not hitherto include within the limits of any province organized under the provincial government act is hereby constituted a province, which shall be known as the Province of Lepanto-Bontoc. This province as divided into three sub-provinces. The sub-province of Lepanto that shall comprise the territory hitherto included in the commendancia of Lepanto. The sub-province of Bontoc that shall comprise the territory hitherto includes in the commendancia of Bontoc and not hitherto included within the boundaries of any province organized under the Provincial Government Act. The sub-province of Amburayan, which shall comprise the territory hitherto included in the commendancia of Amburayan. The town Cervantes prior to its becoming a seat of government of Amburayan sub-province of Mountain Province was a capital of a military province by the Americans when they captured Cervantes. Its military governor was William Dinwiddie.

Later on, Cervantes became a pueblo by virtue of Act No. 441 of the Philippine Commission, which is an act providing for the establishment of a local civil government in the townships and settlements of the Province of Lepanto-Bontoc. And in 1907, Cervantes was transferred to the Province of Ilocos Sur by virtue of the provisions of Act No. 1646, passed by the Philippines Commission on May 15, 1907, providing for the transfer of all sub-provinces of Amburayan and large sections of Lepanto and Benguet to Ilocos Sur and La Union.

In June 1945 the USAFIP NL spearheaded by the 121st Infantry, defeated the Japanese Imperial Forces at Bessang Pass, part of Malaya, Cervantes. During the Japanese occupation it was at Cervantes, particularly at Bessang Pass, that the Japanese forces made their last stand in the operations in the North against a band of Filipino Soldiers and Guerrillas. These events hasten the surrender of General Tomoyuki Yamashita, who is referred to as the “Tiger of Malaya”.

In 1945, Cervantes was burned and destroyed. The brick municipal building, Conchar Hotel, and the sturdy and beautiful houses of the town were burned and reduced to ashes. The main bridge that links Cervantes to Bontoc was bombed.

A handsome monument was unveiled in 1954 at Bessang Pass in honor of the 1,395 United States Armed Forces in the Philippines - Northern Luzon (USAFIP-NL) members killed in this historical place. After the war the town is on its way to recovery and self-sufficiency.

The Cervantes Elementary School is here since the Spanish Regime. Cervantes now has 18 primary and Elementary Schools. Saint Agnes Elementary School was founded on February 18, 1920, and on June 10, 1949, the CICM and ICM missionaries inaugurated the Saint Agnes High School. In 1972 Republic Act 4424 established the Cervantes National School of Arts and Trade, which at present is the Ilocos Sur Polytechnic State College- Cervantes Campus. Another milestone of education was in 1999 when the Cervantes National High School was established, through the initiative of Mayor Benjamin N. Maggay during his first term.

The Cervantes Emergency Hospital was established in 1916 through the initiative of then-Governor Calvo of Mt. Province. In June 1960, Republic Act No. 2775 changed the name of the Cervantes Emergency hospital to Bessang Pass Memorial Hospital in memory of the heroes of Bessang Pass.
Cervantes was energized on March 21, 1991. The power supply came from Mt. Province Electric Cooperative (MOPRECO) through a memorandum of agreement with Ilocos Sur Electric Cooperative (ISECO).

Cervantes became the Summer Capital of the Province of Ilocos Sur by Resolution No. 88 Series of 1993 “A Resolution Declaring Cervantes as the Summer Capital of the Province of Ilocos Sur on March 23, 1993.

On July 5, 1995, an interim Protected Area Management Board (PAMB) was organized and on April 23, 2000, President Joseph Ejercito Estrada signed Proclamation No. 284 declaring Bessang Pass National Shrine as Protected Areas (included to NIPAS Act of 1992 or RA 7560) under Natural Monument/Landmark Category.

On June 11, 1996, the Municipal Government passed Resolution No. 025 series of 1996 declaring June 14 as special non-working holiday for the town of Cervantes.

Geography
Cervantes lies along the southeastern tip of the province located directly north of both Manila and Baguio. It is cut southwesternly by the Abra River, which is biggest and longest river in the area.

Barangays
Cervantes is politically subdivided into 13 barangays. These barangays are headed by elected officials: Barangay Captain, Barangay Council, whose members are called Barangay Councilors. All are elected every three years.

 Aluling
 Comillas North
 Comillas South
 Concepcion
 Dinwede East
 Dinwede West
 Libang
 Malaya
 Pilipil
 Remedios
 Rosario
 San Juan
 San Luis

Climate

Demographics

In the 2020 census, Cervantes had a population of 19,449.

Economy

Government
Cervantes, belonging to the second congressional district of the province of Ilocos Sur, is governed by a mayor designated as its local chief executive and by a municipal council as its legislative body in accordance with the Local Government Code. The mayor, vice mayor, and the councilors are elected directly by the people through an election which is being held every three years.

Elected officials

References

External links

Pasyalang Ilocos Sur
Philippine Standard Geographic Code
Philippine Census Information
Local Governance Performance Management System

Municipalities of Ilocos Sur
Populated places on the Abra River
Mountain resorts in the Philippines